Basil Paul McRae (born January 5, 1961) is a Canadian former professional ice hockey player. He is a part owner and alternate governor of the London Knights in the Ontario Hockey League and he is the director of player personnel for the Columbus Blue Jackets.

Playing career
McRae played his major junior hockey with the London Knights of the Ontario Hockey Association (OHA).

In the 1980 NHL Entry Draft, the Quebec Nordiques drafted McRae in the third round, 87th overall. He played twenty regular season games and nine playoff matches with the big club in 1981, later spending some time with the Fredericton Express of the American Hockey League (AHL). He was traded to the Toronto Maple Leafs for Richard Turmel and spent a couple of years toiling in the minors with the St. Catharines Saints of the AHL. In 1985 McRae signed as a free agent with the Detroit Red Wings but was traded back to his original team, the Nordiques along with John Ogrodnick and Doug Shedden for Brent Ashton, Gilbert Delorme and Mark Kumpel.

At the start of the 1987 season, McRae signed with the Minnesota North Stars, the team he would have the most success with. The 1987–88 season saw McRae play the whole 80 game season with the North Stars, the first time he played a full season in the NHL. He formed a tough enforcer duo along with Shane Churla, leading the league in penalty minutes with 351 in 1990. The Tampa Bay Lightning claimed him in the 1992 NHL Expansion Draft and traded him to the St. Louis Blues in 1993. After a couple of seasons in the Blues organization, McRae signed with the Chicago Blackhawks in 1996 and only managed to play in eight games before retiring from professional hockey.

McRae made a cameo appearance in the movie The Mighty Ducks along with then-teammate Mike Modano.

Post-NHL 
McRae is a part-owner of the London Knights with Dale Hunter and Mark Hunter.  On October 21, 2014, the Knights announced that he would become the general manager and alternate governor of the team, replacing Mark Hunter, who had vacated the general manager position to become the director of player personnel for the Toronto Maple Leafs.  McRae previously worked as a pro scout for the Columbus Blue Jackets and St. Louis Blues.

On July 6, 2016, McRae stepped down as general manager of the London Knights to become the director of player personnel for the Columbus Blue Jackets. He was replaced by former assistant general manager and former assistant coach of the London Knights, Rob Simpson.

Personal life
McRae is the older brother of Chris McRae and is the father of Philip McRae.

Career statistics
Bold indicates led league

See also
List of NHL players with 2000 career penalty minutes

References

External links
 

1961 births
Living people
Adirondack Red Wings players
Canadian ice hockey left wingers
Chicago Blackhawks players
Columbus Blue Jackets executives
Columbus Blue Jackets scouts
Detroit Red Wings players
Fredericton Express players
Ice hockey people from Ontario
London Knights players
Minnesota North Stars players
People from Brock, Ontario
Peoria Rivermen (IHL) players
Quebec Nordiques draft picks
Quebec Nordiques players
St. Catharines Saints players
St. Louis Blues players
St. Louis Blues scouts
Tampa Bay Lightning players
Toronto Maple Leafs players